Akindele Justina Omowunmi (born September 1, 1996), known by her stage name Mz Kiss, is a Nigerian rapper, singer, and songwriter.

Background 
Mz Kiss was born on 1 September 1996 in Okitipupa, a town in local government area of Ondo State, Western Nigeria, she studied Mass Communication.

Musical career 
In 2010, Mz Kiss started her journey into music, she released her debut singles You Go Craze in 2012, Holla at Me in 2013.

She released Figure 8 on April 3, 2013, the first single after singing on to Taurus Musik and Bad Dog Entertainment which received massive reception, thereby gaining her new grounds in the industry.

In 2016, Mz Kiss was nominated for the Rookie of the Year at The Headies 2016 edition, and was nominated in the Best New Act category at the 2016 Nigeria Entertainment Awards.

On September 12, 2018, she received 1 nomination in the Trailblazer of the Year category at 2018 Nigeria Entertainment Awards.

Discography

EP's
Street on the Loose (2016)

Singles
You Go Craze (2012)
Holla at Me (2013)
Figure 8 (2013)
Holla at Me (2013)
Spatacuz (2014)
Owo Meta (2015) 
Stoopid featuring Falz (2015) 
Last Year (2016)
Ikilo (2016)
Enemy Of Progress (2016)
Fuji (2017)
Ijo (2017)
Wawu (2017)
Slow Down (2017)
Merule (featuring Slim Case) (produced by Tiwezi) (2018)
Gbewa (2018)
Igara (2018)
Braaa (2019)
Youth Wake Up (2019)

Awards and recognition

References

1992 births
Living people
People from Ondo State
Nigerian women rappers
21st-century Nigerian women singers
English-language singers from Nigeria
Nigerian hip hop singers
Women hip hop musicians